Rosel "Rosi" Pettinger (born 16 September 1933) is a German former figure skater. She won two German national titles in the 1950s and competed at the 1956 Winter Olympics in Cortina d'Ampezzo, placing tenth. She placed fourth at the 1955 European Championships in Budapest and at the 1956 European Championships in Paris. Her skating club was Münchner EV in Munich.

Competitive highlights

References 

1933 births
Figure skaters at the 1956 Winter Olympics
German female single skaters
Living people
Sportspeople from Munich
Olympic figure skaters of the United Team of Germany
20th-century German women
21st-century German women